Gesca Limitée is a division of the Power Corporation of Canada, which published French-language daily newspapers in the provinces of Quebec and Ontario. 

Gesca has since 2013 responded to the Internet challenge by expanding its free online services, which it supports through advertising.

The only publication that was retained by Gesca at the time, La Presse in Montreal, became an independent non-profit in 2018.

See also
 History of Canadian newspapers
List of newspapers in Canada

Notes

Further reading
 Bernier, Marc-François. "«Radio-Gesca» est-il un phénomène réel?." Chaire de recherche en éthique du journalisme. (2014). online
 Landry, Olivier. "Concentration de la propriété des médias et diversité des contenus dans les quotidiens du groupe Gesca." Recherches sociographiques 52#2 (2011): 233–254.

Newspaper companies of Canada
Power Corporation of Canada
Companies based in Montreal